In college athletics in the United States, institutions typically join in conferences for regular play under different governing bodies.

Varsity sports
There are several national and regional associations governing the varsity teams of colleges and universities.  Varsity teams are typically funded by an institution's athletic department, and under some governing bodies players are eligible for athletic scholarships.

National Collegiate Athletic Association (NCAA)

Division I
Multi-sport conferences
 America East Conference
 American Athletic Conference
 ASUN Conference
 Atlantic 10 Conference
 Atlantic Coast Conference
 Big 12 Conference
 Big East Conference
 Not to be confused with the original Big East. For more details, see 2010–2013 Big East Conference realignment. 
 Big Sky Conference
 Big South Conference
 Big Ten Conference
 Big West Conference
 Coastal Collegiate Sports Association – sponsors only men's and women's swimming & diving, plus women's beach volleyball
 Colonial Athletic Association
 Conference USA
 FBS Independents (applies only to football)
 FCS Independents (applies only to football)
 Horizon League
 Independents (in sports other than football)
 Ivy League
 Metro Atlantic Athletic Conference
 Mid-American Conference
 Mid-Eastern Athletic Conference
 Missouri Valley Conference
 Mountain Pacific Sports Federation – does not sponsor football or basketball
 Mountain West Conference
 Northeast Conference
 Ohio Valley Conference
 Pac-12 Conference
 Patriot League
 Southeastern Conference
 Southern Conference
 Southland Conference
 Southwestern Athletic Conference
 Sun Belt Conference
 The Summit League
 West Coast Conference
 Western Athletic Conference

Football-only conferences
 ASUN–WAC Football Conference – starts play in 2023 as a football-only merger of the ASUN and Western Athletic Conferences
 CAA Football – legally a separate entity from the all-sports Colonial Athletic Association, but both leagues have the same administration
 Missouri Valley Football Conference
 Pioneer Football League

Ice hockey conferences
 Atlantic Hockey (men)
 Central Collegiate Hockey Association (men) – previously operated from 1971 to 2013; revived in 2021
 College Hockey America (women)
 ECAC Hockey
 Hockey East
 Independents
 New England Women's Hockey Alliance
 National Collegiate Hockey Conference (men)
 Western Collegiate Hockey Association (women)

Other single-sport conferences
This list also includes conferences in sports that the NCAA does not split into divisions.
 Central Collegiate Fencing Conference
 Central Collegiate Ski Association – includes one junior-college team alongside NCAA-sanctioned teams
 Collegiate Water Polo Association
 Eastern Intercollegiate Gymnastics League (men)
 Eastern Intercollegiate Ski Association
 Eastern Intercollegiate Volleyball Association (men)
 Eastern Intercollegiate Wrestling Association
 Eastern Women's Fencing Conference
 Golden Coast Conference (men's and women's water polo)
 Great America Rifle Conference
 Intercollegiate Fencing Conference of Southern California
 Metropolitan Swimming Conference
 Mid-Atlantic Collegiate Fencing Conference
 Mid-Atlantic Rifle Conference – includes a mix of NCAA-sanctioned teams and club teams
 Mid-Atlantic Water Polo Conference
 Midwest Fencing Conference
 Midwest Independent Conference (women's gymnastics)
 Midwestern Intercollegiate Volleyball Association (men)
 Mountain Rim Gymnastics Conference (women)
 National Intercollegiate Women's Fencing Association
 Northeast Fencing Conference
 Patriot Rifle Conference
 Rocky Mountain Intercollegiate Ski Association
 Southland Bowling League
 Western Water Polo Association

Division II
 California Collegiate Athletic Association
 Conference Carolinas
 Central Atlantic Collegiate Conference
 Central Intercollegiate Athletic Association
 East Coast Conference
 Great American Conference
 Great Lakes Intercollegiate Athletic Conference
 Great Lakes Valley Conference
 Great Midwest Athletic Conference
 Great Northwest Athletic Conference
 Gulf South Conference
 Independents
 Lone Star Conference
 Mid-America Intercollegiate Athletics Association
 Mountain East Conference
 Northeast-10 Conference
 Northern Sun Intercollegiate Conference
 Pacific West Conference
 Peach Belt Conference
 Pennsylvania State Athletic Conference
 Rocky Mountain Athletic Conference
 South Atlantic Conference
 Southern Intercollegiate Athletic Conference
 Sunshine State Conference

Single sport conferences
 Appalachian Swimming Conference
 Bluegrass Mountain Conference (swimming)
 New South Intercollegiate Swim Conference
 Pacific Coast Swim Conference

Division III
 Allegheny Mountain Collegiate Conference
 American Rivers Conference
 American Southwest Conference
 Atlantic East Conference
 Centennial Conference
 City University of New York Athletic Conference
 Coast to Coast Athletic Conference
 College Conference of Illinois and Wisconsin
 Collegiate Conference of the South
 Colonial States Athletic Conference – merging with the United East Conference in 2023
 Commonwealth Coast Conference
 Empire 8
 Great Northeast Athletic Conference
 Heartland Collegiate Athletic Conference
 Independents
 Landmark Conference
 Liberty League
 Little East Conference
 Massachusetts State Collegiate Athletic Conference
 Michigan Intercollegiate Athletic Association
 Middle Atlantic Conferences – an umbrella organization that operates three conferences.
 The following conferences sponsor the same set of 14 sports, including both men's and women's basketball, but not football:
 MAC Commonwealth
 MAC Freedom
 The third league, the Middle Atlantic Conference (note the singular), combines schools from the Commonwealth and Freedom conferences in a total of 13 sports, including football.
 Midwest Conference
 Minnesota Intercollegiate Athletic Conference
 New England Collegiate Conference – disbanding as an all-sports conference in July 2023 due to severe membership losses, but will remain in operation as a men's volleyball-only conference
 New England Small College Athletic Conference
 New England Women's and Men's Athletic Conference
 New Jersey Athletic Conference
 North Atlantic Conference
 North Coast Athletic Conference
 Northern Athletics Collegiate Conference
 Northwest Conference
 Ohio Athletic Conference
 Old Dominion Athletic Conference
 Presidents' Athletic Conference
 St. Louis Intercollegiate Athletic Conference
 Skyline Conference
 Southern Athletic Association
 Southern California Intercollegiate Athletic Conference
 Southern Collegiate Athletic Conference
 State University of New York Athletic Conference
 United East Conference – merging with the Colonial States Athletic Conference in 2023
 University Athletic Association
 Upper Midwest Athletic Conference
 USA South Athletic Conference
 Wisconsin Intercollegiate Athletic Conference

Single-sport conferences
 Continental Volleyball Conference (men)
 Eastern Collegiate Football Conference
 Midwest Collegiate Volleyball League (men)
 Midwest Lacrosse Conference (men)
 Midwest Women's Lacrosse Conference
 Ohio River Lacrosse Conference
 United Collegiate Hockey Conference
 United Volleyball Conference (men)

National Association of Intercollegiate Athletics (NAIA)

 American Midwest Conference
 Appalachian Athletic Conference
 California Pacific Conference
 Cascade Collegiate Conference
 Chicagoland Collegiate Athletic Conference
 Continental Athletic Conference
 Crossroads League
 Frontier Conference
 Golden State Athletic Conference
 Great Plains Athletic Conference
 Gulf Coast Athletic Conference
 Heart of America Athletic Conference
 Football Independents
 Kansas Collegiate Athletic Conference
 Mid-South Conference
 North Star Athletic Association
 Red River Athletic Conference
 River States Conference
 Sooner Athletic Conference
 Southern States Athletic Conference
 Sun Conference
 Wolverine–Hoosier Athletic Conference

Football-only conference
 Mid-States Football Association

United States Collegiate Athletic Association (USCAA)
 Eastern Metro Athletic Conference
 Eastern States Athletic Conference
 Hudson Valley Intercollegiate Athletic Conference
 Penn State University Athletic Conference
 Yankee Small College Conference

National Christian College Athletic Association (NCCAA)
 Central Region
 Mid-East Region
 Mid-West Region
 North Region
 North Central Region
 South Region
 Southwest Region
 West Region

Association of Christian College Athletics (ACCA)
 Midwest Christian College Conference

National Junior College Athletic Association (NJCAA)
 Alabama Community College Conference
 Arizona Community College Athletic Conference
 Arrowhead Conference
 Bi-State Conference
 Carolinas Junior College Conference
 Colorado Community College Athletic Conference
 Eastern Pennsylvania Collegiate Conference
 Garden State Athletic Conference
 Georgia Junior College Athletic Association
 Great Rivers Athletic Conference
 Illinois Skyway Conference
 Iowa Community College Athletic Conference
 Kansas Jayhawk Community College Conference
 Maryland Junior College Athletic Conference
 Massachusetts Community College Athletic Association
 Michigan Community College Athletic Association
 Mid-Florida Conference
 Mid Hudson Conference
 Mid-State Athletic Conference
 Mid-West Athletic Conference
 Missouri Community College Athletic Conference
 Midwest Football Conference (NJCAA)
 Minnesota College Athletic Conference
 Mississippi Association of Community & Junior Colleges
 MISS-LOU Junior College Conference
 Metro Athletic Conference
 Mon-Dak Conference
 Mountain Valley Conference (NJCAA)
 NJCAA Region 9
 Nebraska Community College Athletic Conference
 North Central Community College Conference
 North Texas Junior College Athletic Conference
 Northeast JC Football Conference
 Ohio Community College Athletic Conference
 Panhandle Conference
 Pennsylvania Collegiate Athletic Association
 Scenic West Athletic Conference
 Southern Conference
 Southwest Junior College Conference
 Southwest Junior College Football Conference
 Suncoast Conference
 Tennessee Community College Athletic Association
 Western Junior College Athletic Conference
 Western New York Athletic Conference
 Western Pennsylvania Collegiate Conference
 Western States Football League
 Wyoming Community College Athletic Conference

California Community College Athletic Association (CCCAA)
 Bay Valley Conference
 Big Eight Conference (California)
 Central Valley Conference
 Coast Conference
 Golden Valley Conference
 Inland Empire Athletic Conference
 Orange Empire Conference
 Pacific Coast Athletic Conference
 South Coast Conference
 Western State Conference

Northwest Athletic Conference (NWAC)
 Northern Region
 Southern Region
 Eastern Region
 Western Region

Independent conferences
 Independent Junior College Athletic Association
 Northern Intercollegiate Athletic Conference
 Pacific Christian Athletic Conference
 Wisconsin Collegiate Conference

Other collegiate sports associations

Boxing
National Collegiate Boxing Association (NCBA)
 United States Intercollegiate Boxing Association (USIBA)

Cycling
ACCC: Atlantic Collegiate Cycling Conference
RMCCC: Rocky Mountain Collegiate Cycling Conference
ECCC: Eastern Collegiate Cycling Conference
SCCCC: South Central Collegiate Cycling Conference
MWCCC: Midwestern Collegiate Cycling Conference
SECCC: Southeastern Collegiate Cycling Conference
NCCCC: North Central Collegiate Cycling Conference
SWCCC: Southwestern Collegiate Cycling Conference
NWCCC: Northwestern Collegiate Cycling Conference
WCCC: Western Collegiate Cycling Conference

Fencing
Baltimore-Washington Collegiate Fencing Conference (BWCFC)
Northern California Intercollegiate Fencing League (NCIFL)
Southern Atlantic Conference (SAC)
Southwestern Intercollegiate Fencing Association (SWIFA)

Gymnastics
East Atlantic Gymnastics League (EAGL) (women)
Eastern Intercollegiate Gymnastics League (EIGL) (men)

Lacrosse
See: :Category:College lacrosse leagues in the United States

Rowing
Eastern Association of Rowing Colleges (EARC) (men)
Eastern Association of Women's Rowing Colleges (EAWRC)
Intercollegiate Rowing Association (IRA) (men)

Sprint football
Collegiate Sprint Football League (CSFL)
Midwest Sprint Football League (MSFL)

Volleyball
Midwest Intercollegiate Volleyball Association

Water polo
Western Water Polo Association

Wrestling
National Collegiate Wrestling Association
Mid-Atlantic – Teams from Tennessee, the Carolinas, Virginia, Maryland, and Delaware
North Central – Teams from Ohio, Michigan, Indiana, Illinois, and Wisconsin
Northeast – Teams from New York, Pennsylvania, New Hampshire, Connecticut, Massachusetts, Rhode Island, and Vermont
Northwest – Teams from Washington and British Columbia
Southeast – Teams from Florida, Alabama, Georgia and Mississippi
Southwest – Teams from Texas, Colorado, New Mexico, Louisiana, and Kansas
West – Teams from California, Nevada, Utah and Arizona

References

College athletics conferences